Carl Robert Duser (July 22, 1932 – January 5, 2023) was an American Major League Baseball pitcher. He played for the Kansas City Athletics during the 1956 and 1958 seasons. He attended Weatherly Area High School, in Pennsylvania.

Duser honorably served his country in the United States Army during the Korean War. He was employed by the Bethlehem Steel as a sales executive for over 27 years until retiring. He was an accomplished professional baseball player including pitching for the Kansas City Athletics from 1956 to 1958, when his career was cut short by an unfortunate automobile accident. He was a Caribbean World Series champion and was inducted into the Baseball Hall of Fame in Pennsylvania. He struck out murder's row which is the top 3 Yankees where he struck out all 3 in a row including Mickey Mantle.

Duser died in Sayre, Pennsylvania, on January 5, 2023, at the age of 90.

References

External links

1932 births
2023 deaths
Major League Baseball pitchers
Kansas City Athletics players
Baseball players from Pennsylvania
People from Hazleton, Pennsylvania
Bethlehem Steel people
Military personnel from Pennsylvania
Albany Senators players
American expatriate baseball players in Panama
Buffalo Bisons (minor league) players
Columbus Jets players
Denver Bears players
Lancaster Red Roses players
Little Rock Travelers players
Sacramento Solons players